Protosticta hearseyi, little reedtail, is a damselfly species in the family Platystictidae. It is endemic to Western Ghats in India.

Description and habitat
It is a small slender damselfly with blue eyes. Its thorax is copper-brown on the dorsum and pale blue laterally. There is a broad black stripe on the postero-lateral suture and anterior part of metepimeron. Abdomen is copper-brown, marked with pale blue. segments 1 and 2 are bluish-white on the sides. Segments 3 to 7 have narrow basal annules extending more broadly along the sides. Segment 8 is turquoise-blue, with a narrow black apical annule. Segments 9 and 10 are black. The small size of the species and its copper-brown colours will help to identify it from all other species in the same genus. It is the only species in which the two sexes are approximately of the same length.

It is known to occur in first order streams with good riparian forest cover.

See also 
 List of odonates of India
 List of odonata of Kerala

References

External links

Platystictidae
Insects of India
Insects described in 1922
Taxa named by Frederic Charles Fraser